Conor Holmes (born 21 May 1967) is an Irish sprint canoer and marathon canoeist who competed in the early 1990s. At the 1992 Summer Olympics in Barcelona, he was eliminated in the repechages of both the K-2 500 m and the K-2 1000 m events.

References
Sports-Reference.com profile

1967 births
Living people
Irish male canoeists
Olympic canoeists of Ireland
Canoeists at the 1992 Summer Olympics
Medalists at the ICF Canoe Marathon World Championships